This is a list of ITL 1 statistical regions of the United Kingdom (formerly NUTS 1) by Human Development Index as of 2021.

References 

United Kingdom
Human Development Index
United Kingdom